Yidishe tsaytung ('Jewish Newspaper') was a Yiddish-language daily newspaper published from Vilna between May and December 1919. The first issue was published on May 9, 1919. The newspaper was the organ of the Vilna Zionist Organization. Dr. Jakub Wygodzki served as the editor of Yidishe tsaytung.

References

Daily newspapers published in Lithuania
Jews and Judaism in Vilnius
Newspapers published in Vilnius
Newspapers established in 1919
Publications disestablished in 1919
Yiddish-language mass media in Lithuania
Yiddish newspapers
Zionism in Lithuania